Netherley is an area in the city of Liverpool, Merseyside, England. It is bordered by Belle Vale and situated near to Huyton, Tarbock and Halewood.

Netherley is a leafy suburb of Liverpool, Merseyside, England. It is in the south of the city surrounded mostly by farmland and countryside, Liverpool City Council ward of Belle Vale. At the 2001 Census, Netherley had a population of 8,068 (3,703 males, 4,365 females).

Description
Netherley is predominantly a residential area located on the eastern side of Liverpool and is taken up by 44% green belt which restricts potential industrial growth.

However Netherley's Caldway Drive is the new location for the Belle Vale Junior Football League which had to relocate from playing fields in nearby Belle Vale to accommodate the building of a new school.

History 
Netherley was built on farmland on the edge of Gateacre in 1968 for tenants moved out of unfit housing in Liverpool city centre.

Lee Manor High School, built in 1970, was originally called Netherley Community Comprehensive School. The school changed its name to Lee Manor High School in the early 1990s and closed in 2000.

Many of Netherley's flats and maisonettes were demolished between 1983 and 1985 to make way for new houses. Lee Valley Housing took over management of council properties in 2003, making improvements to 1,700 homes.

Crime
The area has a relatively low crime rate and high employment in 2020.

Economy
The area lost a major local employer, HPL Jars & Containers, in 2006. After thirty plus years, it was bought out by M&H Plastics and production was transferred out of the area.

Education 
St. Gregory's Catholic Primary School received an excellent Ofsted report in 2005. Built at the same time as the local housing, the school has adapted over the years to meet the demands of the area, such as admitting a large number of pupils from Cross Farm School which was closed by the local educational authority due to a surplus of places in the area. The nearby Norman Pannell Primary School is also a popular school in Netherley.

Other services 
Netherley Health Centre 
Post Office 
Valley Community Theatre

.

Gallery

References

External links 

 Netherley - A Kind of Living Conditions on Netherley housing estate in the 1970s BBC Radio Merseyside
 Netherley - The old Parish of Little Woolton

Areas of Liverpool